Sean Bailey is an American film and television producer. He has been the president of Walt Disney Studios Motion Picture Production since his appointment in 2010.

Career

Early career
As a co-founder and executive of LivePlanet, Bailey served as executive producer for The Emperor's Club, the Emmy Award-nominated Project Greenlight, Push, Nevada (which he also co-wrote with Ben Affleck), producer Best Laid Plans, Matchstick Men, and Gone Baby Gone.

From 2004 to 2008, Bailey continued as chairman and board member of LivePlanet while under a writing-producing deal at ABC Studios. In 2008, the film wing of LivePlanet was dissolved and Bailey teamed with Disney to form the production banner Ideology Inc, which produced Tron: Legacy, the sequel to the 1982 film Tron.

In November 2009, it was announced that Bailey would produce a remake of the 1979 film The Black Hole, which never materialized. He co-wrote (with Ted Griffin) the original screenplay for the 2016 film Solace, starring Anthony Hopkins and Colin Farrell.

Walt Disney Studios

In January 2010, Bailey was named president of production at Walt Disney Studios, overseeing live-action films produced by Walt Disney Pictures and Touchstone Pictures. Under Bailey, Disney has pursued a tentpole film strategy, which included an expanded slate of large-budget films, including franchise sequels, original films, and live-action adaptations of their animated films. The studio found particular success with the latter type of films, which began with the commercial success of Alice in Wonderland (2010), and continued with Maleficent (2014), Cinderella (2015), The Jungle Book (2016),  Pete's Dragon (2016), Beauty and the Beast (2017), Aladdin (2019), and The Lion King (2019). The latter three, along with Alice in Wonderland and Pirates of the Caribbean: On Stranger Tides, have all surpassed $1 billion in global box office, with The Lion King earning nearly $1.7 billion worldwide. The division has also produced reimaginings of other fairy-tale properties such as Oz The Great and Powerful (2013) and Into the Woods (2014)  and more recently expanded its portfolio of these films for both theatrical and streaming platforms with films such as Cruella and Jungle Cruise.

Other tentpole films including The Lone Ranger (2013), Tomorrowland (2015) and literary adaptations of John Carter (2012), The BFG (2016), and A Wrinkle in Time (2018), became box-office disappointments. Despite the renewed focus on tentpole films, the studio continued to produce smaller, "brand-deposit" films, such as The Muppets (2011) and Saving Mr. Banks (2013), a period drama which was the first time the studio had depicted its namesake co-founder onscreen.

With the launch of Disney's streaming service Disney+ in November 2019, Bailey led a significant expansion in the studio's output, spanning several genres. The mix of projects includes reimaginings of classic titles such as Lady and the Tramp and Pinocchio, featuring Tom Hanks as Geppetto; character-driven films such as Togo; inspirational sports dramas such as Rise, about NBA star Giannis Antetokounmpo; and such sequels to popular originals as Hocus Pocus 2 and Enchanted follow-up Disenchanted. The studio also produces adaptations of children's and young adult books such as Timmy Failure: Mistakes Were Made, Flora & Ulysses, Stargirl, and Better Nate Than Ever for Disney+.

In 2012, Bailey was named to the board of Sundance Institute, where he serves as Vice Chair.  In 2015, he joined the Board of Trustees at Caltech, serving on its JPL Committee.

Other Ventures
Bailey is a founding investor of Teremana Tequila, the tequila founded by Dwayne “The Rock” Johnson.

Personal life
Bailey was born to father Jay Bailey, a biochemical engineer and professor at California Institute of Technology before his death in 2001. His former step-mother, Frances Arnold is a chemical engineer and Nobel Laureate. Bailey is married to Charmaine Bailey and they have two children.

References

Disney people
Disney executives
Living people
Year of birth missing (living people)
American film producers
American film studio executives
Walt Disney Pictures